The 1929 World Table Tennis Championships men's doubles was the third edition of the men's doubles championship.
Miklós Szabados and Viktor Barna defeated Sándor Glancz and Laszlo Bellak in the final by three sets to nil.

Results

See also
 List of World Table Tennis Championships medalists

References

-